Soulful is the debut studio album from second-season American Idol winner Ruben Studdard, released on December 9, 2003 by J Records. The record received mixed reviews from critics divided over the quality of the track listing and Ruben's vocal performance. Soulful debuted at number one on the Billboard 200 and spawned two singles: "Sorry 2004" and "What If".

Critical reception

Soulful garnered mixed reviews from music critics divided over the track listing and Studdard's vocal performance. A writer for People said that Soulful does "a good job of translating to record the cuddly Velvet Teddy Bear charm that won over Idol fans, resulting in a likable if unspectacular set." David Browne, writing for Entertainment Weekly, commended the "penthouse R&B and mild hip-hop" tracks by Swizz Beatz and Irv Gotti for providing versatility in Studdard's performance but found his vocals on the ballads to be "raw and unpolished," filled with mediocrity whenever he "either strains or sings flat." The A.V. Clubs Keith Phipps said that the show favorite ballads were the highlights compared to more uptempo tracks like "No Ruben" and "What Is Sexy", concluding that following in this direction shows that "even the most obviously talented contestant to walk the Idol stage seems fated to be forever a glorified karaoke champ." Sal Cinquemani of Slant Magazine also found the ballads Studdard performed on the show showcase his strengths more than tracks like "Don't Quit On Me" and "Take the Shot" that are "insufferably repetitive and tuneless", calling the overall record "a painfully predictable mix of traditional R&B glop and comparatively forced contemporary hip-hop." Barry Walters from Rolling Stone heavily criticized the songwriters and producers for crafting material that sounds like "Broadway ripoffs of hip-hop-inspired R&B", concluding that "Studdard does the best he can, but the people behind him and the other Idols simply aren't trying."

Commercial performance
The album debuted at number one on the Billboard 200, selling over 417,000 copies in its first week, and was certified Platinum by the RIAA in January 2004. In the U.S. the album sold an estimated 1,779,000 copies.

Track listing

Personnel
Adapted from AllMusic.

 Kamel Abdo – engineer
 Kwaku Alston – photography
 June Ambrose – stylist
 Maxi Anderson – background vocals
 David Ashton – Pro Tools, vocal engineer
 Elena Barere – concert master, violin
 Davis A. Barnett – viola
 Bob Becker – viola
 Eric Bell – background vocals
 Cecilia Bereal-Powell – background vocals
 Joseph Jr. Bereal – background vocals
 Latanya Bereal – vocal contractor, background vocals
 Melissa Bereal – background vocals
 Charlie Bisharat – violin
 Jim Bottari – engineer, string engineer
 Paul Boutin – engineer
 Joel Bowers – background vocals
 Felecia Bowles – choir/chorus, group member
 Leslie Brathwaite – mixing
 Chandler Bridges – Pro Tools
 Jacqueline Bridges – choir/chorus, group member
 Jamie Brown – choir/chorus, group member
 David Campbell – arranger, string arrangements
 Terrence Cash – assistant engineer
 Rob Chiarelli – mixing
 Steve Churchyard – engineer
 Tanisha J. Cidel – choir/chorus, group member
 Melvin Coleman –  producer
 Steve Conover – engineer
 Larry Corbett – cello
 Cenovia Cummins – violin
 Ashley Davis – background vocals
 Clive Davis – producer
 Kevin KD Davis – mixing
 Mike Davis – assistant
 Vidal Davis –  instrumentation, mixing, producer
 Eric Dawkins –  vocal director, background vocals
 Andrea Derby – production coordination
 Joel Derouin – concert master
 Vincent Dilorenzo – engineer
 Jonathan Dinklage – violin
 PamKenyon Donald – production manager
 Crystal Drummer – background vocals
 Nathan East – bass
 Fat Joe – featured artist, guest artist, primary artist
 Lawrence Feldman – flute
 Steve Ferrera – drums
 Barry Finclair – violin
 Angela Fisher – background vocals
 Steve Fisher – assistant
 Ghislaine Fleischmann – violin
 Bruce Fraser – engineer
 John Frye – mixing
 Simon Fuller – management
 Armen Garabedian – violin
 Berj Garabedian – violin
 Chris Gehringer – mastering
 Serban Ghenea – mixing
 Larry Gold – conductor, string arrangements
 Peter Gordon – French horn
 Gordon Goss – assistant engineer
 Irv Gotti – producer
 Hart Gunther – assistant engineer
 Noel Hall –  keyboards
 Fred Hammond –  drum programming, featured artist, guest artist, mixing, primary artist, vocals, background vocals
 Ray Hammond – mixing engineer
 Kevin Hanson – guitar
 Andre Harris – instrumentation, mixing, producer
 Dabling Harward – editing, engineer
 Al Hemberger – engineer, mixing
 Dino Hermann – Pro Tools
 Kevin Hicks –  producer 
 Larry Jackson – A&R  
 Mark Jaimes – guitar
 Jazze Pha – producer 
 Suzie Katayama – cello
 Rich Keller – mixing
 Andrew Kennedy – background vocals
 Eric King – background vocals
 Olga Konopelsky – violin
 Emma Kummrow – violin
 Charlene Kwas – violin
 Edward Lawson – background vocals
 Ricky Lawson – drums
 Chris LeBeau – artwork
 Lil Ronnie – instrumentation, producer
 Harold Lilly –   producer, vocal producer, background vocals
 Vince Lionti – viola
 Richard Locker – cello
 Jennie Lorenzo – cello
 Kev Mahoney – assistant engineer
 Harvey Mason Jr. –   group member, producer
 John McGlinchey – assistant
 James McMillan – arranger, producer
 Kevin Milburn – background vocals
 David Earl Miller – choir/chorus, group member
 Cindy Mizelle – guest artist, background vocals
 Rob Mounsey – conductor, guest artist, keyboards, piano, string arrangements
 Peter Murray – keyboards, piano
 Peter Nocella – viola
 Sid Page – violin
 Alyssa Park – violin
 Bob Peterson – violin
 Greg Phillinganes – keyboards
 Malcolm Pollack – engineer
 Postmaster – programming
 James Poyser – piano
 Karie Prescott – viola
 Pretty Tony – featured artist, guest artist, primary artist
 Alex Reverberi – engineer
 Michele Richards – violin
 Tim Roberts – assistant
 Mark Robertson – violin
 Evan Rogers – producer
 Jonn Savannah – Pro Tools
 Jon Smeltz – mixing
 Dan Smith – cello
 Richard Sortomme – violin
 Brian Springer – engineer
 Ruben Studdard – primary artist, vocals, background vocals
 Carl Sturken – guitar, keyboards, producer
 Swizz Beatz – producer
 Igor Szwec – violin
 Damon Thomas –  group member, producer
 Gerard Thomas – producer
 Michael Thompson – guitar
 Tribe Called Judah – choir/chorus, group
 The Underdogs – group, instrumentation, producer
 Josefina Vergara – violin
 Alonzo Vargas – assistant engineer
 Tommie Walker – drum programming
 Doc Wiley – engineer
 Anthony Wilkins – background vocals
 Evan Wilson – viola
 Kevin Wilson – assistant engineer, engineer
 Mike "Hitman" Wilson – engineer
 John Wittenberg – violin
 Joey Woolfalk – guitar
 A.J. Wright – choir/chorus
 Gavyn Wright – orchestra leader
 Alexis Yraola – art direction, design
 Helen Zeigler – choir/chorus, group member

Charts and certifications

Weekly charts

Certifications

Year-end charts

See also
 List of Billboard 200 number-one albums of 2003
 List of Billboard number-one R&B albums of 2004

References

2003 debut albums
Ruben Studdard albums
19 Recordings albums
J Records albums
Albums produced by Irv Gotti
Albums produced by Swizz Beatz
Albums produced by Carl Sturken and Evan Rogers
Albums produced by Dre & Vidal
Albums produced by the Underdogs (production team)